A by-election was held for the New South Wales Legislative Assembly electorate of Bankstown on 13 September 1980 following the death of Nick Kearns.

By-elections for the seats of Ku-ring-gai and Murray were held on the same day.

Dates

Results

Nick Kearns died.

See also
Electoral results for the district of Bankstown
List of New South Wales state by-elections

References

1980 elections in Australia
New South Wales state by-elections
1980s in New South Wales